Paolo Sassone-Corsi (8 June 1956 – 22 July 2020) was an Italian researcher and molecular biologist.

Biography
Sassone-Corsi defended his thesis on molecular biology at the University of Naples Federico II in 1979. He then obtained a post-doctoral degree under the instruction of Pierre Chambon in Strasbourg and under Inder Verma at the Salk Institute for Biological Studies in San Diego. In 1989, he began working as a research director for the French National Centre for Scientific Research at Institute of Genetics and Molecular and Cellular Biology in Strasbourg. Beginning in 2006, he worked for the University of California, Irvine as a professor. In 2011, he began as Director of the Department of Epigenetics and Metabolism.

In 2013, Sassone-Corsi published a book of reflections written alongside Erri De Luca.

Scientific Contribution
Sassone-Corsi's work largely focused on the implementation of molecular approaches for cell signaling, circadian rhythm, epigenetics, and the plasticity of the genome.

Distinctions
Medal of the European Molecular Biology Organization (1994)
Prix Liliane-Bettencourt (1997)
Grand Prix Charles-Leopold Mayer of the French Academy of Sciences (2003)
Silver Medal of the French National Centre for Scientific Research (2004)

Books
Ti sembra il Caso ? (2013)

References

1956 births
2020 deaths
Italian molecular biologists
Scientists from Naples
University of Naples Federico II alumni